Tararua is a name used in several contexts:

The Tararua Range, in the southeast of New Zealand's North Island
The Tararua District of New Zealand, named for the Range.
The Tararua Forest Park, New Zealand's first forest park 
The SS Tararua, a 19th-century passenger steamship.
Tararua (spider) is a genus of the Agelenidae spider family.

See also
Tararu, a township in the northern North Island of New Zealand